Quercus lancifolia is a species of oak found in Central America and Mexico.

Description

Habitat and range
Quercus lancifolia inhabits montane cloud forests between 500 and 2,400 meters elevation. It can be a dominant species where it occurs.

In Mexico it is found in the southern Sierra Madre Oriental of Hidalgo, Veracruz, and Puebla states, the Sierra Madre de Oaxaca in Puebla and Oaxaca states, the Chiapas Highlands, and the Sierra Madre de Chiapas of Chiapas and adjacent Guatemala. In Central America it inhabits the Maya Mountains of Belize and the highlands of Guatemala, Honduras, Nicaragua, Costa Rica, and western Panama.

Conservation and threats
Quercus lancifolia is affected by habitat loss and habitat fragmentation across most of its range. Of Mexico's original 3.1 million ha of cloud forest, only 28% remained by 2002, and half of what remained was degraded or secondary forest. In Veracruz only 10% of the original cloud forest area remains.

Although the population has not been quantitatively assessed, there are no reports of continued decline. The species' conservation status is assessed as Least Concern.

References

lancifolia
Oaks of Mexico
Trees of Central America
Cloud forest flora of Mexico
Flora of the Central American pine–oak forests
Flora of the Central American montane forests
Flora of the Chiapas Highlands
Flora of the Sierra Madre Oriental
Flora of the Sierra Madre de Oaxaca
Sierra Madre de Chiapas
Flora of the Talamancan montane forests
Plants described in 1830